Arturo De Vecchi (30 April 1898 – 6 January 1988) was an Italian fencer. He won a silver medal in the team sabre event at the 1932 Summer Olympics.

References

External links
 
 
 

1898 births
1988 deaths
Italian male fencers
Olympic fencers of Italy
Fencers at the 1928 Summer Olympics
Fencers at the 1932 Summer Olympics
Olympic silver medalists for Italy
Olympic medalists in fencing
Sportspeople from Messina
Medalists at the 1932 Summer Olympics